Dead Can Dance are an Australian music duo first established in Melbourne. Currently composed of Lisa Gerrard and Brendan Perry, the group formed in 1981. They relocated to London the following year. Australian music historian Ian McFarlane described Dead Can Dance's style as "constructed soundscapes of mesmerising grandeur and solemn beauty; African polyrhythms, Gaelic folk, Gregorian chant, Middle Eastern music, mantras, and art rock."

Having disbanded in 1998, they reunited briefly in 2005 for a world tour and reformed in 2011 when they released and toured a new album, Anastasis. They released a new album in 2018 called Dionysus and toured Europe in 2022.

Career

Formation and early years
Dead Can Dance was formed in Melbourne, Australia, in August 1981 with Paul Erikson on bass guitar, Lisa Gerrard (ex-Microfilm) on vocals and percussion, Simon Monroe (Marching Girls) on drums and Brendan Perry (also of Marching Girls) on vocals and guitar. Gerrard and Perry were a couple who met as members of Melbourne's Little Band scene. In May 1982, the band left Melbourne and moved to London, England, where they signed with alternative rock label 4AD. With the duo, the initial United Kingdom line-up were Paul Erikson and Peter Ulrich.

The group's debut album, Dead Can Dance, was released in February 1984. The artwork, which depicts a ritual mask from New Guinea, "provide[s] a visual reinterpretation of the meaning of the name Dead Can Dance", set in a faux Greek typeface. The album featured "drum-driven, ambient guitar music with chanting, singing and howling", and fit in with the ethereal wave style of label mates Cocteau Twins. They followed with a four-track extended play, Garden of the Arcane Delights in August. AllMusic described their early work as "as goth as it gets" (despite the group themselves rejecting the label), while the EP saw them "plunging into a wider range of music and style".

For their second album, Spleen and Ideal, the group comprised the core duo of Gerrard and Perry with cello, trombone and tympani added in by session musicians. Released in November 1985, it was co-produced by the duo and John A. Rivers. Raggett describes it as "a consciously medieval European sound [...] like it was recorded in an immense cathedral". The group built a following in Europe, and the album reached No. 2 on the UK indie charts. In 1989, Gerrard and Perry separated domestically – Gerrard moved to Barcelona before returning to Australia and Perry moved to Ireland – but still wrote, recorded and performed as Dead Can Dance.

Success

The duo's sixth studio album, Into the Labyrinth, was issued in September 1993 and dispensed with guest musicians entirely; it sold 500,000 copies worldwide and appeared in the Billboard 200. The band became 4AD's highest-selling act. They followed with a world tour in 1994 and recorded a live performance in California which was released as Toward the Within, with video versions on Laserdisc and VHS (later on DVD). Many unofficial bootlegs of concerts spanning its career exist, containing several rare songs that were only performed live. Toward the Within is the duo's first official live album, which reached the Billboard 200 and was followed by In Concert 19 years later. Gerrard released her debut solo recording, The Mirror Pool, and reunited with Perry on the Dead Can Dance studio album Spiritchaser in 1996. The album also charted on Billboard 200 and reached No. 1 on the Top World Music Albums Chart.

Disbandment and reunions
In 1998, Dead Can Dance began recording a follow-up album to Spiritchaser, which was due to be released in early 1999 followed by a planned world tour. However, they separated before it was completed and canceled the tour. One song from the recording sessions, "The Lotus Eaters", was eventually released on the box set Dead Can Dance (1981-1998) and on the two-disc compilation Wake (2003). Gerrard teamed with Pieter Bourke (Snog, Soma) to issue Duality in April 1998. Perry released Eye of the Hunter in October 1999.

Dead Can Dance reunited in 2005 and released limited-edition recordings of thirteen shows from its European tour and eight recordings from the subsequent North American tour, as well as a compilation titled Selections from Europe 2005. These concerts were recorded and released on The Show record label. In 2005, the song "Nierika" became part of the opening titles for Mexican television station TV Azteca's soap opera La Chacala.

On 12 May 2011 Brendan Perry announced on his official web forum that Dead Can Dance would record a new album and then embark on two-month world tour. The band made a formal announcement about its world tour and new album, Anastasis, for a release date of 13 August 2012.

On 30 September 2011, Dead Can Dance announced the release of a four track EP entitled Live Happenings – Part 1 available for free download from their website. Since December, the EP Live Happenings – Part 2 replaced the first EP. Both EPs contain songs from their 2005 Tour. Since 31 January 2012, the EP available was Live Happenings – Part 3, to be replaced by Live Happenings – Part IV on 20 March 2012.

In late 2011, the band announced a reunion world tour, including 12 US cities, to be accompanied by the release of a live album on a new label. The tour was scheduled to begin on 9 August 2012 in Canada and continue until 19 September 2012 in Turkey, 21 and 23 September in Greece, 13 October in Russia, then 28 October 2012 in Ireland, then Mexico and South America and then in Lebanon and finally Australia in February 2013. On 15 November 2012 it was announced that the band would be returning to Europe to continue its tour, starting on 28 May 2013 in Portugal. The final show of the Anastasis World Tour was in Santiago, Chile, on 13 July 2013.

On 8 September 2015, the band announced the sale of Brendan Perry's Quivvy Church Studio. When asked what this decision meant for the future of Dead Can Dance, Perry responded on the band's official Facebook page that the band has relocated to France and that they are in the process of fabricating a new recording and rehearsal studio.

On 21 April 2018, Perry announced mastering of a new album would be commencing at Abbey Road Studios. The new album, Dionysus, was released on 2 November 2018.

In September 2018, their website announced "A Celebration – Life & Works 1980-2019" tour with dates in Europe in May and June 2019. In contrast to previous tours, the setlist drew heavily from the band's older catalogue, featuring some songs the band had never before played live. In October 2019, the band announced a second leg of the tour with dates in North America, Mexico and South America. However, the tour was postponed to 2021 due to the COVID-19 pandemic. The 2021 tour as well as rescheduled dates for later in the year were also cancelled citing COVID-19. A 2022 European tour did take place, and a second European leg was scheduled for the later in the year as well as a North American leg for 2023. However, in September 2022 the band announced the cancellation of both the second European leg as well as the North American dates citing unspecified health reasons.

Discography

Studio albums
 Dead Can Dance (1984)
 Spleen and Ideal (1985)
 Within the Realm of a Dying Sun (1987)
 The Serpent's Egg (1988)
 Aion (1990)
 Into the Labyrinth (1993)
 Spiritchaser (1996)
 Anastasis (2012)
 Dionysus (2018)

Awards and nominations

ARIA Music Awards
The ARIA Music Awards is an annual awards ceremony that recognises excellence, innovation, and achievement across all genres of Australian music. They commenced in 1987.

! 
|-
| 1996
| Spiritchaser
| ARIA Award for Best World Music Album
| 
| 
|-
| 2012
| Anastasis
| Best World Music Album
| 
| 
|-

Australian Music Prize
The Australian Music Prize (AMP) is an annual award of $30,000 given to an Australian band or solo artist in recognition of the merit of an album released during the year of the award. The award commenced in 2005.

|-
| 2018
| Hope Downs
| Australian Music Prize
| 
|-

See also
List of ambient music artists

References

External links

 
 Dead Can Dance interviews  from the Echoes public radio show
 
 

 

4AD artists
PIAS Recordings artists
Musical groups established in 1981
Musical groups disestablished in 1998
Victoria (Australia) musical groups
Australian musical duos
Australian world music groups
Australian gothic rock groups
Ethereal wave musical groups
Australian post-punk groups
Dream pop musical groups
Neoclassical dark wave musical groups
Neofolk music groups